This is a list of seasons completed by the Rutgers Scarlet Knights football program since the team's conception in 1869. The program competes in the National Collegiate Athletic Association (NCAA) Division I Football Bowl Subdivision (FBS) and the Scarlet Knights have participated in more than 1,300 officially sanctioned games, including 11 bowl games. Rutgers originally competed as a football independent and competed in multiple conferences, most recently joining the Big Ten Conference in 2014.

Seasons

 

‡ The Big East did not begin full round–robin play until 1993.
*Ash was fired mid-season on September 29, 2019.
# From 1929–1975, Rutgers was in a three team conference called The Middle Three Conference. Rutgers won 32 conference championships in that conference, but the NCAA listed Rutgers as an independent during this time.

References

Rutgers

Rutgers Scarlet Knights football seasons